Kaaterskill Falls may refer to:

Kaaterskill Falls, a waterfall in the Catskill Mountains of New York
Kaaterskill Falls (film)
Kaaterskill Falls (novel), a 1998 novel by Allegra Goodman
Kaaterskill Falls (painting), an 1832 painting by Thomas Cole